Ludivine Dedonder (born 17 March 1977) is a Belgian politician of the Socialist Party (PS) who has been serving as Minister of Defence in the government of Prime Minister Alexander De Croo since 2020.

References 

Living people
1977 births
Politicians from Tournai
Belgian Ministers of Defence
Women government ministers of Belgium
Socialist Party (Belgium) politicians
University of Liège alumni
21st-century Belgian women politicians
21st-century Belgian politicians
Female defence ministers